Stoycho Nedkov is a Bulgarian footballer who plays as a winger and a wing-back. He is a disciple of the Levski Sofia youth academy, where he was team captain.

Career

Youth years
Nedkov joined the Levski youth academy in 1998, scoring a total of 90 goals in 142 games. 

In 2004, as a member of Levski's U-19 squad, he gained notoriety during a friendly match versus Levski's men's team when he scored the winning goal against national team goalie Georgi Petkov. 

He went on to score 14 goals during the 2004/05 season as Levski won the U-19 title.

Senior career
Nedkov's contribution to winning the youth title was noticed by scouts for Portuguese League side Académica de Coimbra, who invited him to Portugal for a tryout. He was ultimately unable to join the club as the quota for non-EU players had already been filled.

He went on to play for Septemvri Sofia, Vihren Sandanski, Orfeas Nicosia (gaining promotion to next division), and Vitosha Bistritsa, with whom he won the Amateur League Cup in 2012.

Nedkov is a graduate of the National Sports Academy with a bachelor's degree in football coaching and holds a UEFA B Licence.

References

1986 births
Living people
Bulgarian footballers
Footballers from Sofia
Association football wingers
Orfeas Nicosia players